Jon Pernell Roberts (June 21, 1948 – December 28, 2011), born John Riccobono, was a noted drug trafficker and government informant, operated in the Miami area and was an associate of Colombia's Medellín Cartel during the growth phase in cocaine trafficking, 1975–1986. After his arrest, he was able to avoid a lengthy prison sentence by becoming a cooperating witness and proactive informant for the federal government. He was the author with Evan Wright of American Desperado.

Early life
Roberts was born in New York City, New York to a Sicilian American father and non-Italian mother. His father Nat Riccobono had earlier moved with his brothers from Sicily and made a living through involvement with various shady businesses throughout New York in the late 1940s. Riccobono eventually became a made member in the La Cosa Nostra mafia. After being convicted of various crimes, Riccobono was kicked out of the United States and deported to Sicily. Roberts' uncles were also made members of the Gambino crime family.  After being apprehended by police for kidnapping, Roberts was given an opportunity to expunge his record with military service. Roberts claims to have served with the 101st Airborne for four years in Vietnam, though no records could be found proving his military service. Upon returning to the United States from Vietnam, Roberts was an associate member/soldier in the Gambino family. Roberts has confessed to committing extortion, assault, money laundering, racketeering in the early 1970s.

In Vietnam
In American Desperado Roberts recounts how he was given the option to join the US Army in order to have charges for kidnapping and attempted murder dropped. He said he enjoyed Army life and was trained as a paratrooper. He was assigned to a special squad of three men when he arrived in Vietnam. They made many missions deep into enemy territory. He recounts numerous instances of killing children and women of all ages for no real reason other than fun. He also describes torturing and skinning alive enemy combatants in retaliation for the enemy committing similar atrocities.  His squad was eventually hit by an errant U.S. artillery shell. One squad member was blown to pieces, another had half his face blown away, but lived. Roberts himself had a large hole blown open in his skull and he had a metal plate inserted.

Introduction to the Medellín Cartel
As demand for cocaine increased, Roberts found his Cuban suppliers unable to meet his demand. Through Roberts' girlfriend, he met Mickey Munday. Munday was a trafficker who introduced Roberts to Medellín agent Rafael "Rafa" Cardona Salazar. At first, Munday was apprehensive of Roberts, who had driven up in a black Mercedes Benz, which Munday described as having "drug dealer written all over it". He also stated that Roberts' flashy car and flamboyant lifestyle made Roberts look like "someone I wanted nothing to do with".

Nevertheless, Roberts and Munday began working under the supervision of Max Mermelstein, who had an agreement with Salazar to manage the transportation of cocaine from Colombia to Miami. He then oversaw the delivery of the loads to cartel safehouses in the Miami area. Roberts was able to increase his monthly cocaine business through this direct connection.  Mermelstein and Munday established the routes for trips to Colombia, using boats, tow truck companies, safehouses, and airstrips, thereby setting up an effective transportation route for the cartel. Roberts claims to have made over $100 million USD dealing cocaine during this period. He spent $50 million of that money on his extravagant lifestyle. In the book American Desperado, Roberts claims that he had $150 million in a Panamanian bank, over $50 million invested in real estate and businesses, as well as several million in cash hidden in various safe houses and hiding spaces.

Horses
In American Desperado, Roberts describes: "After I made my first big score selling coke to Bernie Levine in California, Danny Mones told me racehorses were a good way to launder money." He and Danny Mones "started Mephisto Stables in 1977".

In Chapter 62 of the book, Roberts recounts a variety of processes by which he used horses to launder money. Additionally, "[He] also learned how to fix races. There were many tricks."

Also in chapter 62, Roberts describes another benefit to horses:  "Dealing cocaine had promoted me into high society. Owning racehorses took me into the stratosphere." He recounts prominent people he met through his racehorse connections, such as "Judge Joe Johnson, who hosted horse auctions", and through him, "We got friendly with Cliff Perlman, who owned Caesar's Palace. When I'd go to Caesar's and get comped, everybody assumed it was because of my Mafia connections. No, I was connected to Caesar's Palace by a Kentucky judge." Through the same circle, "We ended up becoming friends with Al Tannenbaum and his girlfriend, Gloria. Al was a guy who'd made it big in stereos."

He describes a particular horse in the epigraph to his book: 
Desperado, the horse that I thought would win the Derby and make me famous as something more than a gangster, was a baby when I got him. He hadn't been trained how to run, but he could already fly on the grass. He had good instincts. He didn't like other horses. You don't want a sociable horse. They stay in the pack. You want a horse who likes to run in front of all the other horses. Desperado was a killer. I named him Desperado because I saw myself in his eyes.

Roberts also describes an honest jockey he had hired, and that jockey's demise:
At Calder, I had a jockey named Nick Navarro who worked for me. He was one of the good guys.  He wouldn't hold horses or charge them or run them on dope. He was very skilled, and when I ran my horses clean, I used Nick.

One day in 1977 [sic] he ran a race for me at Calder. I walked up to him after he finished. He put his hand up to wave, and there was a powerful explosion. A bolt of lightning came out of the sky and hit him.

Multiple news outlet reports support Roberts' recollection, except they fix the date one year later. As they document: on December 28, 1978, jockey Niconar "Nick" Navarro was killed by a direct lightning strike after completing the second race at Calder Race Course. The remaining eight races at the track that day were cancelled.

Downfall
Mermelstein acted as a high-level trafficker working under cartel member Salazar and with the Munday transportation group. He was apprehended in 1985 by the US Customs Service as a multi-kilo dealer, and subsequently turned state's witness. Roberts was arrested on the morning of September 20, 1986.

Later years and death
According to his ex-wife and various other sources, Roberts used his past to gain trust within the criminal community and report their activities to the authorities in order to maintain his prison-free status. Others have also accused Roberts of being a confidential informant; one of the Fort Lauderdale police officers who arrested him in 1997 for stalking an ex-girlfriend, possession of a firearm, and resisting arrest with violence testified he "found out later he's been a snitch or something. He was a CI [confidential informant] for somebody."

In a 2009 Miami New Times article, Roberts' lifestyle when he lived in Hollywood, Florida, was described as follows:

In 2011, Garcia-Roberts interviewed Roberts' American Desperado co-author Evan Wright for a Miami New Times article (coincidentally dated one month before Roberts' death). In the article, titled "American Desperado: Co-Author Evan Wright on Coke Cowboy Jon Roberts' Memoir", the two authors discuss the book as well as their impressions and experiences when interviewing Roberts. For example, they share that Roberts was not completely reformed in his later days:

Roberts died of colorectal cancer on December 28, 2011, aged 63.

See also
Cocaine Cowboys
Mickey Munday 
Max Mermelstein

References

1948 births
2011 deaths
People from Miami
Criminals from New York City
Medellín Cartel traffickers
American drug traffickers
American people of Italian descent
Deaths from cancer
21st-century American writers